Aashiq Hoon Baharon Ka is a 1977 Indian Bollywood romance film drama, directed by J. Om Prakash. The movie was indirectly produced by Rajesh Khanna. It was lavishly mounted—shot in Europe. The climax had action scenes - a crocodile fight, gas chamber, car chase, boat chase, mid-air fight but the movie however did not do too well.

Plot
Ashok successfully completes his studies and becomes a M.Sc. graduate. His mother wants him to pursue his higher studies in Switzerland, but Ashok hesitates as more money is required. But his mother convinces him and sends him to Switzerland. Ashok stays in the place arranged by the friend of his principal who owns a hotel and also is a step-father of a spoilt Vikram, who hates Ashok. He meets Veera, an arrogant girl who tries to steal his car while on his way to a car race. Ashok wins a car race and sends the money which he won in the race to his mother. Veera's father meets Ashok and proposes a business deal with him in the field of atomic science. Ashok accepts the deal as he requires Uranium to continue his research. Veera and Ashok fall in love, which is disliked by Vikram as he wants to marry her and grab all her property. Hence, he frames a Uranium theft crime with the help of Ashok's assistant. Ashok is jailed by Veera's father and Veera also believes her father. But Ashok proves his innocence by making Vikram accept his acts by himself. Veera pleads guilty for her acts and apologises to Ashok. Veera's father accepts their love on a condition that he should stay in Switzerland forever, to which Ashok refuses and Veera also supports Ashok. Vikram kidnaps Veera and demands a huge sum of money from her father for her release. Veera's father unwillingly seeks Ashok's help to bring back Veera. Ashok fights with Vikram and rescues Veera and both unite finally.

Cast
Rajesh Khanna as Ashok Sharma
Zeenat Aman as Veera Rai
Danny Denzongpa as Vikram (Jamunada's son)
Preeti Ganguli as Mary John
Julie as Olga
Pinchoo Kapoor as Mr. John
Sulochana Latkar as Ashok's mother
Nadira as Heera (Jamunda's wife)
Om Prakash as Mr. Jamunadas
Rehman as Mr. Chandidas Rai
Asrani as Murlidhar

Soundtrack

External links
 

1977 films
Indian romantic drama films
1970s Hindi-language films
1977 romantic drama films
Films scored by Laxmikant–Pyarelal
Films directed by J. Om Prakash